The 1996–97 Gonzaga Bulldogs men's basketball team represented Gonzaga University in the West Coast Conference (WCC) during the 1996–97 NCAA Division I men's basketball season. Led by fifteenth-year head coach Dan Fitzgerald, the Bulldogs were  overall in the regular season (8–6 in WCC, tied for fourth), and played their home games on campus at the Charlotte Y. Martin Centre in Spokane, Washington.

As announced two years earlier, athletic director Fitzgerald stepped down as head coach after the season, and nine-year assistant Dan Monson was promoted.

Postseason results

|-
!colspan=6 style=| WCC tournament

References

External links
Sports Reference – Gonzaga Bulldogs men's basketball – 1996–97 season

Gonzaga Bulldogs men's basketball seasons
Gonzaga
1996 in sports in Washington (state)
1997 in sports in Washington (state)